Ashley Pérez (born 12 February 1994) is a Puerto Rican basketball player for the Puerto Rican national team.

She participated at the 2018 FIBA Women's Basketball World Cup.

References

External links

1994 births
Living people
Basketball players from Connecticut
Guards (basketball)
James Madison Dukes women's basketball players
Sportspeople from Manchester, Connecticut
Puerto Rican women's basketball players